KJMD (98.3 FM) is a radio station broadcasting a Contemporary Hit Radio format, licensed to Pukalani, Hawaii, United States.  The station is owned by Pacific Radio Group, Inc.

History
The station went on the air as KMVI-FM on 1984-04-05. On 11 February 2002, the station changed its call sign to the current KJMD.

References

External links
KJMD website

Contemporary hit radio stations in the United States
JMD
Radio stations established in 1984